Sunday Oboh (born on August 25, 1987) is a Nigerian footballer (Striker) playing currently for Perseru Serui.

References

External links
Profile at liga-indonesia.co.id

1987 births
Living people
Nigerian footballers
Nigerian expatriate footballers
Association football forwards
Expatriate footballers in Indonesia
Liga 1 (Indonesia) players
Nigerian expatriate sportspeople in Indonesia
Perseru Serui players